Priska  may refer to:
 Priska Doppmann (born 1971), a Swiss road racing cyclist
 Priska Nufer (born 1992), a Swiss alpine ski racer
 Priska Madelyn Nugroho (born 2003), an Indonesian tennis player
 Priska Polačeková (born 1954), a former Czechoslovak/Slovak handball player
 997 Priska, a main-belt asteroid

See also 
 Prisca
 Piroska

Feminine given names